Três de Maio (English: "Third of May") is a Brazilian municipality in the state of Rio Grande do Sul.

It has an area of 422,2 km². It is located 343 m over sea level. As of 2020 its population was estimated to be 23,876 inhabitants. Its climate is mild with temperatures of 20 °C (68 °F) to 35 °C (95 °F) in summer and 0 (32 °F) to 15 °C (59 °F) in winter.

Notable residents
Supermodel Gisele Bündchen and Evlyn Eickoff were born in Três de Maio.

See also 
 Riograndenser Hunsrückisch (regional German dialect)

References

Municipalities in Rio Grande do Sul